Maria Viktorovna Kechkina, née Shilova (born 6 August 1986) is a Russian orienteering and ski-orienteering competitor and Junior World Champion in both sports.

Orienteering
Kechkina won a gold medal in the relay at the 2006 Junior World Orienteering Championships in Druskininkai, together with Ekaterina Terekhova and Tatiana Kozlova. She finished 8th in the long course and 10th in the sprint at the same championship.

Ski orienteering
Shilova received a gold medal in relay, a silver medal in sprint and a bronze medal in the middle distance at the Junior World Ski Orienteering Championships in Ivanovo in 2006.

External links

References

1986 births
Living people
Russian orienteers
Ski-orienteers
Foot orienteers
Female orienteers
21st-century Russian women
Junior World Orienteering Championships medalists